"As Long as He Needs Me" is a torch song sung by the character of Nancy in the 1960 musical Oliver! and written by Lionel Bart. Georgia Brown, who was the first actress to play Nancy, introduced the song. It is a love ballad expressing Nancy's love for her criminal boyfriend Bill Sikes despite his mistreatment of her. In the film adaptation of the musical, it was sung by Shani Wallis.

A reprise of this song towards the end of the show expresses Nancy's affection for young Oliver Twist, implying that she now feels that the child also needs her. This reprise was omitted from the film version.

Its popularity grew by virtue of renditions by several popular singers, including Shirley Bassey who reached number two for 5 weeks on the United Kingdom charts with the song. Bassey's recording became one of the highest sellers of 1960 staying on the UK charts for 30 weeks. The song has also been sung as "As Long as She Needs Me", when sung by a male singer. Maureen Evans had a version.  In 1963 Sammy Davis Jr. recorded the song, reaching #19 on the Billboard Easy Listening chart.

References

External links
 Songs Of Shirley Bassey Song Info

Songs from Oliver!
1960 songs
Songs written by Lionel Bart
Nancy Wilson (jazz singer) songs
Dionne Warwick songs
Shirley Bassey songs
Columbia Records singles
Torch songs
1960 singles
1963 singles